Feminist credit unions are credit unions founded by feminists to address discriminatory practices in lending. The first feminist credit union was founded in Detroit, Michigan in 1974.

In the United States 
In the United States, feminist credit unions rose to prominence in the 1970s and many began disbanding in the 1980s. The Feminist Economic Network was founded in 1975 as an alliance of several feminist credit unions in the United States. In 1976, there were 17 or 18 feminist credit unions across the country.

In 1976, Carol Seajay and Paula Wallace received a loan from the San Francisco Feminist Federal Credit Union to start a feminist bookstore called Old Wives Tales.

References

Further reading 

 Michals, Debra (December 2018). "The Buck Stops Where? 1970s Feminist Credit Unions, Women's Banks, and the Gendering of Money". Business History Conference, via ResearchGate.

Feminist organizations